The women's singles of the 2016 Advantage Cars Prague Open tournament was played on clay in Prague, Czech Republic.

María Teresa Torró Flor was the defending champion, but lost in the first round to Denisa Allertová.

Antonia Lottner won the title, defeating Carina Witthöft in the final, 7–6(8–6), 1–6, 7–5.

Seeds

Main draw

Finals

Top half

Bottom half

References

External Links
 Main draw

Advantage Cars Prague Open - Singles
Advantage Cars Prague Open